Mateusz Kowalczyk (born 3 May 1987) is a Polish tennis player who specialises in doubles.

Career
He reached his highest doubles ranking of world no. 77 on September 9, 2013. He has played with Tomasz Bednarek, Błażej Koniusz, Marcin Gawron, and Artem Sitak.

ATP career finals

Doubles: 3 (1 title, 2 runner-ups)

Challengers and futures titles (18)

External links
 
 
 Official site of Mateusz Kowalczyk

1987 births
Living people
Polish male tennis players
People from Chrzanów
Sportspeople from Lesser Poland Voivodeship
21st-century Polish people